The Powerpuff Girls is an American animated television series created by Craig McCracken for Cartoon Network. The series began as a student film called Whoopass Stew, made by McCracken while he attended the California Institute of the Arts in 1992. Two additional shorts, "Meat Fuzzy Lumpkins" and "Crime 101", later aired on Cartoon Network's World Premiere Toons. The series officially premiered on November 18, 1998, lasting 6 seasons with 78 episodes total. A Christmas special and a 10th anniversary special were also produced. Episodes of The Powerpuff Girls have seen numerous DVD and VHS releases as well. The musical episode "See Me, Feel Me, Gnomey" was never aired in the United States, but was broadcast on YTV in Canada in 2004–2005 as well as in other countries (including Japan), and is included on the complete series DVD box set.

Series overview

Episodes

Whoopass Stew
A short was made by Craig McCracken while he was in college at CalArts. He submitted it to Cartoon Network, with the name "Whoopass Stew" changed to "The Powerpuff Girls". Four pilot shorts were started, though only one was finished. The other three pilots are presented on the Complete Series DVD set accompanied by the original storyboards and their original audio.

What a Cartoon! shorts
Both shorts are written and directed by Craig McCracken, with Genndy Tartakovsky as animation director, Paul Rudish as art director and Mike Moon as layout designer.

Season 1 (1998–99)

Season 2 (1999–2000)

Season 3 (2000–01)

Season 4 (2001–02)

Season 5 (2003–04)

Season 6 (2004–05)

Specials

Christmas special (2003)

10th anniversary special (2009)
A special 22-minute episode was produced to celebrate the series' 10th anniversary. The episode in question, "The Powerpuff Girls Rule!!!", aired on January 19, 2009, and is included as a bonus feature on the 10th anniversary DVD box set.

CGI special (2014)
On January 28, 2013, it was announced that a new CGI special titled "Dance Pantsed" starring the girls would premiere late 2013. By the end of the year however, it was announced that the special would air on January 20, 2014. Craig McCracken did not participate in the production and has had no say regarding the special.

Home media

The following is a list of Blu-ray, DVD, and VHS releases for The Powerpuff Girls. Season one was first released in 2007 on Region 1 (US) and Region 4 (Australia); no other seasons were released separately in the United States, though seasons 2 and 3 were released in Australia. To mark the 10th anniversary of the show in 2009, the complete series DVD box set containing all the seasons, the Christmas TV movie, and "The Powerpuff Girls Rule!!!" special was released in the US; in 2015, the complete series was released on DVD in Australia.

VHS
At least eight different VHS tapes were released before the format gradually switched to DVD & Blu-ray. Some of the releases mentioned below were subsequently re-released on DVD, the VHS format came to an end in 2003 for the series.

DVD

Complete collections

Notes

References

Lists of American children's animated television series episodes
episodes
Lists of Cartoon Network television series episodes
1990s television-related lists
2000s television-related lists